

A–C 

To find entries for A–C, use the table of contents above.

D 

 D.A.Cooke – David Alan Cooke (born 1949)
 D.A.Herb. – Desmond Andrew Herbert (1898–1976)
 Dahl – Anders Dahl (1751–1789)
 Dahlgren – Bror Eric Dahlgren (1877–1961)
 Dahlst. – Gustav Adolf Hugo Dahlstedt (1856–1934)
 D.A.Keith – David A. Keith (fl. 2001)
 Daléchamps – Jacques Daléchamps (also as Jacobus Dale Champius) (1513–1588)
 Dallim. – William Dallimore (1871–1959)
 Dalpé – Yolande Dalpé (born 1948)
 Daly – Douglas C. Daly (born 1953)
 Dalzell – Nicol Alexander Dalzell (1817–1877)
 Dalziel – John McEwan Dalziel (1872–1948)
 D'Amato – Giovanni Frederico D'Amato (born 1941)
 Da M.Li – Da Ming Li (fl. 2007)
 Dammer – Carl Lebrecht Udo Dammer (1860–1920)
 D.A.Morrison – David A. Morrison (born 1958)
 Dana – James Dwight Dana (1813–1895)
 Dandy – James Edgar Dandy (1903–1976)
 Danert – Siegfried Danert (1926–1973)
 Danesi – L. Danesi (1851–1915)
 Danet – Frédéric Danet (born 1968)
 Danguy – Paul Auguste Danguy (1862–1942)
 Daniell – William Freeman Daniell (1818–1865)
 Daniels – Francis Potter Daniels (1869–1947)
 Danielsen – Anders Danielsen (1919–2006)
 Danihelka – Jiří Danihelka (born 1968)
 Däniker – Albert Ulrich Däniker (1894–1957)
 Danin – Avinoam Danin (born 1939)
 Dans. – Pierre Mackay Dansereau (1911–2011) 
 Danser – Benedictus Hubertus Danser (1891–1943)
 Danthoine – D. Danthoine (1739–1794)
 Danzé-Corsin – Paule Danzé-Corsin (fl. 1956)
 Darby – John M. Darby (1804–1877)
 Darbysh. – S.J. Darbyshire (born 1953)
 Darl. – William Darlington (1782–1863)
 Darling – Samuel Taylor Darling (1872–1925)
 D.Arora – David Arora (born 1957)
 Darwin – Charles Darwin (1809–1882)
 Das – Atulananda Das (1879–1952)
 D.A.Simpson – David Alan Simpson (born 1955) 
 D.A.Sutton – David A. Sutton (born 1952)
 Daubs – Edwin Horace Daubs (fl. 1965)
 Dauncey – Elizabeth Anne Dauncey (born 1965)
 Daveau – Jules Alexandre Daveau (1852–1929)
 Davenp. – George Edward Davenport (1833–1907)
 Davey – Frederick Hamilton Davey (1868–1915)
 David – Armand David (1826–1900)
 Davidse – Gerrit Davidse (born 1942)
 Davidson – Anstruther Davidson (1860–1932)
 Davies – Hugh Davies (1739–1821)
 Davis – John Jefferson Davis (1852–1937)
 D.A.Webb – David Allardice Webb (1912–1994)
 Dawson – John William Dawson (1820–1899)
 Day – Alva George Day (born 1920)
 D.Beards. – David Beardsell (fl. 1992)
 D.B.Horne – David Bertram Horne (born 1940)
 D.Brândză – Dimitrie Brândză (1846–1895) 
 D.B.Ward – Daniel Bertram Ward (1928–2016)
 DC. – Augustin Pyramus de Candolle (1778–1841)
 D.C.Eaton – Daniel Cady Eaton (1834–1895)
 D.C.McClint. – David Charles McClintock (1913–2001)
 D.Cooper – Dorothy Cooper (born 1941)
 D.C.Stuart – D.C. Stuart (born 1940)
 D.D.Awasthi – Dharani Dhar Awasthi (1922–2011)
 D.D.Baldwin – David Dwight Baldwin (1831–1912)
 D.D.Cunn. – David Douglas Cunningham (1843–1914)
 D.Dean Cunn. – Darrell Dean Cunningham (born 1951)
 D.Dietr. – David Nathaniel Dietrich (1799–1888)
 D.D.Keck – David D. Keck (1903–1995)
 D.Don – David Don (1799–1841)
 D.Donati – Davide Donati (born 1975)
 D.D.Perkins – David Dexter Perkins (1919–2007)
 D.D.Spauld. – Daniel D. Spaulding (fl. 2016)
 D.Drake – Daniel Drake (1785–1852)
 D.D.Tao – De Ding Tao (born 1937)
 Deam – Charles Clemon Deam (1865–1953)
 de Bary – Anton de Bary (1831–1888)
 Debeaux – Jean Odon Debeaux (1826–1910)
 D.E.Beetle – Dorothy Erna Beetle (née Schoof, later Beetle-Pillmore) (1918–2005)
 Decne. – Joseph Decaisne (1807–1882)
 D.Edwards – Dianne Edwards (born 1942)
 De Franceschi – D. De Franceschi (fl. 1993)
 Degen – Árpád von Degen (1866–1934)
 Degl. – Jean Vincent Yves Degland (1773–1841)
 Deguchi – Hironori Deguchi (born 1948)
 Dehnh. – Friedrich Dehnhardt (1787–1870)
 Deinboll – Peter Vogelius Deinboll (1783–1874)
 de Kok – Rogier Petrus Johannes de Kok (born 1964)
 de Kruif – A.P.M. de Kruif (fl. 1984)
 Delahouss. – A. James Delahoussaye (fl. 1967)
 DeLaney – Kris R. DeLaney (fl. 1989)
 de Lange – Peter James de Lange (born 1966)
 de Laub. – David John de Laubenfels (born 1925)
 Delavay – Pierre Jean Marie Delavay (1834–1895)
 D.E.Lee – Daphne Euphemia Lee (born 1950)
 Deless. – Jules Paul Benjamin Delessert (1773–1847)
 Deleuze – Joseph Philippe François Deleuze (1753–1835)
 Delev. – Theodore Delevoryas (1929–2017) 
 Delf – Ellen Marion Delf (1883–1980)
 Delile – Alire Raffeneau Delile (1778–1850)
 Dell – Bernard Dell (born 1949)
 D.Ellis –  David Ellis (1874–1937)
 Demoly – Jean-Pierre Demoly (born 1951)
 Dempster – Lauramay Tinsley Dempster (1905–1997)
 De M.Wang – De-Ming Wang (born 1970)
 Denham – Dixon Denham (1786–1828)
 Denis – Marcel Denis (1897–1929)
 Denisse – Étienne Denisse (1785–1861)
 Dennes – George Edgar Dennes (1817–1871) 
 Dennst. – August Wilhelm Dennstedt (1776–1826)
 De Not. – Giuseppe De Notaris (1805–1877) ("Giuseppe" sometimes as "Josephus")
 Deori – Numal Chandra Deori (fl. 1988)
 Deplanche – Émile Deplanche (1824–1875)
 Deppe – Ferdinand Deppe (1794–1861)
 De Puydt – Paul Émile de Puydt (1810–1891)
 Derbès – August Alphonse Derbès (1818–1894)
 de Roon – Adrianus Cornelis de Roon (1928–2011)
 Deschamps – Louis Auguste Deschamps (1765–1842)
 Déségl. – Pierre Alfred Déséglise (1823–1883)
 Desf. – René Louiche Desfontaines (1750–1833)
 De Smet – Louis De Smet (1813–1887)
 Des Moul. – Charles Robert Alexandre des Moulins (1798–1875)
 Desp. – Jean-Baptiste-René Pouppé Desportes (1704–1748)
 Despr. – Jean-Marie Despréaux (erroneously Louis Despréaux Saint-Sauveur) (1794–1843)
 Desr. – Louis Auguste Joseph Desrousseaux (1753–1838)
 Desv. – Nicaise Auguste Desvaux (1784–1856)
 Detmers – Freda Detmers (1867–1934)
 De Vis – Charles Walter De Vis (1829–1915)
 de Vogel – Eduard Ferdinand de Vogel (born 1942)
 de Vos – Cornelis de Vos (1806–1895)
 de Vries – Hugo de Vries (1848–1935)
 de Vriese – Willem Hendrik de Vriese (1806–1862)
 de Wet – Johannes Martenis Jacob de Wet (1927–2009)
 Dewèvre – Alfred Aloys Dewèvre (1866–1897)
 Dewey – Chester Dewey (1784–1867)
 De Wild. – Émile Auguste Joseph De Wildeman (1866–1947)
 De Winter – Bernard de Winter (born 1924) 
 de Wit – Hendrik de Wit (1909–1999)
 Deyl – Miloš Deyl (1906–1985)
 D.Fairchild – David Fairchild (1869–1954)
 D.Fang – Ding Fang (born 1920)
 D.F.Austin – Daniel Frank Austin (1943–2015)
 D.F.Brunt. – Daniel Francis Brunton (born 1948)
 D.F.Cutler – David Frederick Cutler (born 1939)
 D.F.Fisch. – Daniel Ferdinand Heinrich Albert Fischer (1865–1927)
 D.G.Burch – Derek George Burch (born 1933)
 D.G.Lloyd – David Graham Lloyd (1937–2006)
 D.G.Long – David Geoffrey Long (born 1948)
 D.Hanb. – Daniel Hanbury (1825–1875)
 D.Hawksw. – David Leslie Hawksworth (born 1946)
 D.H.Davis – Diana Helen Davis (born 1945)
 D.H.Goldman – Douglas H. Goldman (fl. 1995)
 D.H.Kent – Douglas Henry Kent (1920–1998)
 D.H.Norris – Daniel H. Norris (1933–2017)
 D.H.Scott – Dukinfield Henry Scott (1854–1934)
 D.H.Wagner – David H. Wagner (born 1945)
 Di Capua – Ernesta Di Capua (1875–1943)
 Dice – James C. Dice (fl. 1995)
 Dicks. – James (Jacobus) J. Dickson (1738–1822)
 Didr. – Didrik Ferdinand Didrichsen (1814–1887)
 Dieck – Georg Dieck (1847–1925)
 Dieckmann – Juana G. Dieckmann (1888–1960)
 Died. – Hermann Diedicke (1865–1940)
 Dieder. – Christoph Diederichs (fl. 1989)
 Diederich – Paul Diederich (born 1959)
 Diederichsen – Axel Diederichsen (fl. 2001)
 Diego – Nelly Diego (fl. 2001)
 Diego-Esc. – Valentina Diego-Escobar (fl. 2008)
 Diehl – William Webster Diehl (1891–1978)
 Diekm. – Rolf Diekmann (fl. 2000)
 Diels – Friedrich Ludwig Emil Diels (1874–1945)
 Diem – José Diem (1899–1986)
 Dien – B.S. Dien (fl. 1998)
 Dierb. – Johann Heinrich Dierbach (1788–1845)
 Dierckx – Frans Dierckx (1863–1937)
 Diers – Lothar Diers (fl. 1978)
 Diesing – Karl (Carl) Moriz (Moritz) Diesing (1800–1867)
 Dietel – Paul Dietel (1860–1947)
 Dieter. – Carl Friedrich Dieterich (1734–1805)
 Dieterle – Jennie van Ackeren Dieterle (1909–1999)
 Dietrichson – E. Dietrichson (fl. 1954)
 Dietz – Samuel M. Dietz (fl. 1970)
 Dietzow – W. Ludwig von Dietzow (died 1945)
 Diguet – Léon Diguet (1859–1926)
 Dill. – Johann Jacob Dillenius (1684–1747)
 Dillwyn – Lewis Weston Dillwyn (1778–1855)
 Dilst – Floor J. H. van Dilst (born 1934)
 D.I.Morris – Dennis Ivor Morris (1924–2005)
 Ding Hou – Ding Hou (1921–2008)
 Dingler – Hermann Dingler (1846–1935) 
 Dinsm. – John Edward Dinsmore (1862–1951)
 Dinter – Moritz Kurt Dinter (1868–1945)
 Dippel – Leopold Dippel (1827–1914)
 Dissing – Henry Dissing (1931–2009)
 D.J.Bedford – David John Bedford (born 1952)
 D.J.Carr – Denis John Carr (1915–2008)
 D.J.Crawford – Daniel J. Crawford (born 1942)
 D.J.Dixon – Dale J. Dixon (fl. 1997)
 D.J.Galloway – David John Galloway (1942–2014)
 D.J.Keil – David John Keil (born 1946)
 D.J.Middleton – David John Middleton (born 1963)
 D.J.Murphy – Daniel J. Murphy
 D.Legrand – Carlos Maria Diego Enrique Legrand (1901–1986)
 D.J.N.Hind – David John Nicholas Hind (born 1957)
 D.Livingstone – David Livingstone (1813–1873)
 D.L.Jacobs – Donald Leroy Jacobs (born 1919)
 D.L.Jones – David Lloyd Jones (born 1944)
 D.Löve – Doris Löve (1918–2000)
 D.L.Roberts – David Lesford Roberts (born 1974)
 D.M.Andrews – Darwin Maxson Andrews (1869–1938)
 D.M.Bates – David Martin Bates (born 1935)
 D.M.Britton – Donald Macphail Britton (1923–2012)
 D.M.Hend. – Douglas Mackay Henderson (1927–2007)
 D.M.Moore – David Moresby Moore (1933–2013)
 D.Mohr – Daniel Matthias Heinrich Mohr (1780–1808)
 D.Morris – Daniel Morris (1844–1933)
 D.M.Porter – Duncan MacNair Porter (born 1937)
 D.Müll.-Doblies – Dietrich Müller-Doblies (born 1938)
 D.Müll.-Doblies & U.Müll.-Doblies (D. et U. M.-D., D. & U. M.-D.) – Dietrich Müller-Doblies & Ute Müller-Doblies
 D.Naras. – D. Narasimhan (born 1960)
 D.Nicolle – Dean Nicolle (born 1974)
 Dobell – Clifford Dobell (1886–1949)
 Dobrocz. – Dariya Nikitichna Dobroczajeva (1916–1995)
 Dockrill – Alick William Dockrill (1915–2011)
 Dod – Donald Dungan Dod (1912–2008)
 Dode –  (1875–1943)
 Dodoens – Rembert Dodoens (also as Rembertus Dodonaeus) (1517–1585)
 Dodson – Calaway Homer Dodson (born 1928)
 Doidge – Ethel Mary Doidge (1887–1965)
 Döll – Johann Christoph Döll (1808–1885)
 Dollfus – Gustave Frédéric Dollfus (1850–1931)
 Dombrain – Henry Honywood Dombrain (1818–1905)
 Domin – Karel Domin (1882–1953)
 Domke – Friedrich Walter Domke (1899–1988)
 Done – Christopher Charles Done (born 1946)
 Donn – James Donn (1758–1813)
 Donn.Sm. – John Donnell Smith (1829–1928)
 Door. – Simeon Gottfried Albert Doorenbos (1891–1980)
 Dop – Paul Louis Amans Dop (1876–1954)
 Dorf – Erling Dorf (1905–1984)
 Dörfelt – Heinrich Dörfelt (born 1940)
 Dörfl. – Ignaz Dörfler (1866–1950)
 Doronkin – Vladimir M. Doronkin (born 1950)
 Dorr – Laurence Joseph Dorr (born 1953)
 Dorsett – Palemon Howard Dorsett (1862–1943)
 Dostál – Josef Dostál (1903–1999)
 Douglas – David Douglas (1798–1834)
 Douglass M.Hend. – Douglass Miles Henderson (1938–1996)
 Douin – Charles Isidore Douin (1858–1944)
 Doum. – François Doumergue (?1858–1938)
 Doust – Andrew N.L. Doust (fl. 1992)
 Dowe – John Leslie Dowe (fl. 1993)
 Doweld – Alexander Borissovitch Doweld (born 1973)
 Dowell – Philip Dowell (1864–1936)
 Downie – Dorothy G. Downie (1894–1960)
 Downing – Trisha L. Downing (fl. 2004)
 D.Parodi – Domingo Parodi (1823–1890)
 D.P.Banks – David P. Banks (fl. 1998)
 D.Popenoe – Dorothy Kate Popenoe (1899–1932)
 D.P.Ye – De Ping Ye (fl. 2014)
 Drabble – Eric Frederic Drabble (1887–1933)
 Drake – Emmanuel Drake del Castillo (1855–1904)
 Drapiez – Pierre Auguste Joseph Drapiez (1778–1856)
 Drees – Friedrich Wilhelm Drees
 Drège – Johann Franz Drège (1794–1881)
 Drejer – Salomon Thomas Nicolai Drejer (1813–1842)
 Dressler – Robert Louis Dressler (born 1927)
 D.R.Hunt – David Richard Hunt (born 1938)
 Dring – Donald Malcolm Dring (1932–1978)
 Drinnan – Andrew N. Drinnan (fl. 1986)
 D.Rivera –  (born 1958)
 D.R.Morgan – David R. Morgan (fl. 1990)
 Drobow – Vasiliĭ Petrovich Drobow (1885–1956)
 Droissart – Vincent Droissart (fl. 2007)
 D.Royen – David van Royen (1727–1799)
 Druce – George Claridge Druce (1850–1932)
 Drude – Carl Georg Oscar Drude (1852–1933)
 Drumm. – Thomas Drummond (1780–1835)
 Drury – Heber Drury (1819–1905)
 Dryand. – Jonas Carlsson Dryander (1748–1810)
 D.S.Conant – David Stoughton Conant (1949–2018)
 D.S.Edwards – David Sydney Edwards (born 1948)
 D.Thomas – David Thomas (1776–1859)
 D.T.Rouse – Dean T. Rouse (fl. 2003)
 Dubard – Marcel Marie Maurice Dubard (1873–1914)
 Duboscq – Octave Joseph Duboscq (1868–1943)
 Duby – Jean Étienne Duby (1798–1885)
 Duch. – Pierre Étienne Simon Duchartre (1811–1894)
 Duchass. – Édouard Placide Duchassaing de Fontbressin (1818–1873)
 Duchesne – Antoine Nicolas Duchesne (1747–1827)
 Ducke – Adolpho Ducke (1876–1959)
 Ducker – Sophie Charlotte Ducker (1909–2004)
 Duclaux – Émile Duclaux (1840–1904)
 Dufft – Adolf Dufft (1800–1875)
 Dufour – Léon Jean Marie Dufour (1780–1865)
 Dufr. – Pierre Dufresne (1786–1836)
 Dugand – Armando Dugand (1906–1971)
 Duggar – Benjamin Minge Duggar (1872–1956)
 Duhamel – Henri Louis Duhamel du Monceau (1700–1782)
 Dulac – Joseph Dulac (1827–1897)
 Dum.Cours. – Georges Louis Marie Dumont de Courset (1746–1824)
 Dümmer – Richard Arnold Dümmer (1887–1922)
 Dumort. – Barthélemy Charles Joseph Dumortier (1797–1878)
 Dunal – Michel Félix Dunal (1789–1856)
 Dunkley – Harvey Lawrence Dunkley (born 1910)
 Dunlop – Clyde Robert Dunlop (born 1946)
 Dunn – Stephen Troyte Dunn (1868–1938)
 Dunst. – Galfrid C. K. Dunsterville (1905–1988)
 Dupr. – François Hippolyte Dupret (1853–1932)
 Dupuy – Dominique Dupuy (1812–1885)
 Du Puy – David J. Du Puy (born 1958–)
 Duque – Jaramillo Jesus Maria Duque (1785–1862)
 Durand – Elias (Elie) Magloire Durand (1794–1873)
 Durazz. – Antonio Durazzini (fl. 1772)
 Duretto – Marco F. Duretto (born 1964)
 Durieu – Michel Charles Durieu de Maisonneuve (1796–1878)
 Du Roi – Johann Philipp Du Roi (1741–1785)
 Dürrnb. – Adolf Dürrnberger (1838–1898)
 d'Urv. – Jules Sébastian César Dumont d'Urville (1790–1842)
 Dusén – Per Karl Hjalmar Dusén (1855–1926)
 Duss – Antoine Duss (1840–1924)
 Duthie – John Firminger Duthie (1845–1922)
 Dutilly – Arthème Dutilly (1896–1973)
 Duval – Henri August Duval (1777–1814)
 Duy – Nong Van Duy (fl. 2012)
 Duyfjes – Brigitta Emma Elisabeth Duyfjes (born 1936)
 D.Verma – Durgesh Verma (born 1987)
 D.Vidal – Domingo Vidal (died 1878)
 D.Watling – D. Watling (fl. 2004)
 Dwig. – Iwan Alexeevič Dwigubskij (1771–1839)
 Dw.Moore – Dwight Munson Moore (1891–1985)
 Dwyer – John Duncan Dwyer (1915–2005)
 D.X.Zhang – Dian Xiang Zhang (born 1963)
 Dyal – Sarah Creecie Dyal (1907–1993)
 Dyer – William Turner Thiselton (Thistleton) Dyer (1843–1928)
 D.Y.Hong – De Yuan Hong or Hong DeYuan(g) (born 1936)
 Dykes – William Rickatson Dykes (1877–1925)
 Dy Phon – Pauline Dy Phon (1933–2010)
 D.Zohary – Daniel Zohary (1926–2016)

E–Z 

To find entries for E–Z, use the table of contents above.

 
1

Botanists